Pupin may refer to:
 Mihajlo Pupin
 Pupin Hall
 Pupin (crater)
 Pupin Bridge